Edward Ronald Eddie Daniels  is a South African Anglican bishop. He has been Bishop of Port Elizabeth since 2019.

Daniels was educated at Chri J. Botha School, St Paul's Theological College and Nelson Mandela University. He worked in Port Elizabeth from 2003 to 2019.

References

Living people
Anglican bishops of Port Elizabeth
21st-century Anglican Church of Southern Africa bishops
Nelson Mandela University alumni
Alumni of St Paul's Theological College in Grahamstown
Year of birth missing (living people)